Sukhumi Babushara Airport , previously known as Sukhumi Dranda Airport, and also known as Vladislav Ardzinba Sokhumi International Airport , is the main airport of Abkhazia.

History
The airport was built in the mid-1960s, when the region was part of the Soviet Union. In the Soviet era, it was used only for domestic flights, primarily to transport people from across the Soviet Union to the sunny beaches of Abkhazia. The airport was heavily damaged during the civil war in the early 1990s. Land mines and other explosive remnants of war have been cleared from the airport since by the HALO Trust, the only land mine clearance agency active in Abkhazia at the present time.

The airport is currently only used for flights to the mountain village of Pskhu and for flights carried out by Russian Air Force.

In 2006, the government of the Republic of Abkhazia expressed its desire to resume international air traffic in the future; however, the facility is not recognized as an international airport by ICAO, and flights can be allowed only with the permission of the Georgian government.

There is another airport in Abkhazia near Gudauta, which serves Russian military troops located there, and an airstrip in Pskhu.

Future plans
In July 2019, the leadership of Abkhazia issued a decree to open the “Vladislav Ardzinba Sukhumi International Airport” for international flights.

See also 
1993 Sukhumi airliner attacks

External links
 Babushara airport on Airliners.net

References

Sukhumi
Transport in Abkhazia
1960s establishments in Georgia (country)
Airports built in the Soviet Union
Novaport